Wustermark is a municipality of the Havelland district, in Brandenburg, Germany.

History
It was established in 2002 through a merger of the five villages Buchow-Karpzow, Elstal, Hoppenrade, Priort and Wustermark.

Near Elstal are the remains of the Olympic Village of the 1936 Summer Olympics in Berlin.

Demography

References

External links

Localities in Havelland